Šárka Marčíková (born 12 March 1992) is a Czech handballer for Frisch Auf Göppingen and the Czech national team.

She participated at the 2018 European Women's Handball Championship.

References

External links

1992 births
Living people
Sportspeople from Zlín
Czech female handball players
Expatriate handball players
Czech expatriate sportspeople in Germany
Czech expatriate sportspeople in Poland
Frisch Auf Göppingen players